Sean and Shawn were the pen-names of John Klamik (July 22, 1935 – January 5, 2005), was an American artist specializing in gay male erotica and comics. His homosexual-themed cartoons were among the first to appear in US publications, including a regular feature in the early years of The Advocate. He worked under two pen-names: Shawn for more mainstream gay publications such as In Touch, and Sean for fetish publications such as Drummer and Bound & Gagged.

Career 
Klamik was born on July 22, 1935 in Chicago, and studied at the Art Institute. He moved to West Hollywood, California in the mid 1960s, where he worked in an art factory producing paintings for hotel rooms, and as Display Director for the Akron stores.

His first erotic work was "published" in 1963, by taking photographs of the illustrations and making prints in home darkrooms. In 1965, he began doing editorial and gag comics for The Advocate, and in the late 1960s did a half-page series under the title "Gayer Than Strange".

In the 1970s he did both softcore and hardcore illustrations for erotic novels and collections of short stories published by Larry Townsend, and his Leatherman’s Handbook. In the mid 1970s he created stand-alone wordless hardcore comics Biff and Biff Bound for San Francisco publisher Le Salon, which featured centerfolds with 10 and 15 men having sex, respectively. During this time he produced eighteen 10-page comics stories for hardcore photo-story magazines published by Nova Studios, which were reprinted in Meatmen. In the 1980s he also did art direction for some of Nova's porn films and videos. In the late 1980s he produced "Up the Block", a humor comic strip set in a gay neighborhood, for Frontiers. He produced 27 installments of "Jake", a 4-page series for Jock magazine; over 20 episodes of "Dick Darling, Hollywood Cover Boy", a 2- or 4-page strip for a twink-themed porn magazine; and 7 episodes of "Johnny Guitar" for another magazine.

At the end of the 1980s, he moved to Phoenix, Arizona, and continued to work with California publishers by mail.

Personal life 
In 1965 Klamik began a relationship with Jim Newberry; they remained companions until Klamik's death from lung cancer in 2005.

References

1935 births
2005 deaths
American cartoonists
American comics artists
Artists from Chicago
American gay artists
LGBT comics creators
Pseudonymous artists
Fetish artists
Gay male erotica
LGBT people from Illinois
Deaths from cancer in the United States
Deaths from lung cancer
20th-century American LGBT people